The men's 1000 metres in short track speed skating at the 2010 Winter Olympics began on February 17. The final was held on February 20 at the Pacific Coliseum.

Results

Heats

Quarterfinals

Semifinals

Finals

Final B (Classification round)

Final A (Medal round)

External links
 2010 Winter Olympics results: Men's 1000 m (heats), from http://www.vancouver2010.com/; retrieved 2010-02-19.
 2010 Winter Olympics results: Men's 1000 m (quarterfinals), from http://www.vancouver2010.com/; retrieved 2010-02-19.
 2010 Winter Olympics results: Men's 1000 m (semifinals), from http://www.vancouver2010.com/; retrieved 2010-02-19.
 2010 Winter Olympics results: Men's 1000 m (final), from http://www.vancouver2010.com/; retrieved 2010-02-19.

Men's short track speed skating at the 2010 Winter Olympics